Grevillea dunlopii is a species of flowering plant in the family Proteaceae and is endemic to the northern part of the Northern Territory. It is a spreading shrub with divided leaves with nine to seventeen spreading lobes, and pale cream-coloured to white flowers.

Description
The upper surface of the leaves is covered with woolly hairs but the lower surface is mostly obscured.

Taxonomy
Grevillea dunlopii was first formally described in 2000 by Robert Owen Makinson in the Flora of Australia, based on plant material collected near Mount Gilruth in 1978. The specific epithet (dunlopii) honours Clyde Dunlop who collected the type specimens and was curator of the Northern Territory Herbarium.

Distribution and habitat
This grevillea grows on sandstone escarpments, often near watercourse or in shallow sand in Kakadu National Park and western Arnhem Land.

References

 
dunlopii
Proteales of Australia
Endemic flora of Australia
Flora of the Northern Territory
Plants described in 2000
Taxa named by Robert Owen Makinson